Kokshetau, formerly known as Kokchetav (the official name between 1868–1993) is a lakeside city in northern Kazakhstan and the capital of Akmola Region, which stretches along the southern shore of Lake Kopa, lying in the north of Kokshetau Hills, a northern subsystem of the Kokshetau Uplands (Saryarka) and the southern edge of the Ishim Plain. It is named after the Mount Kokshe. Earlier, it was the administrative center of Kokshetau Region, which was abolished in 1997. It is also situated at the junction of the Trans-Kazakhstan and South Siberian railways.

It has 150,649 inhabitants (2022 est.), up from 123,389 (1999 census), while Akmola Region had a total population of 738,587 (2019 est.), down from 1,061,820 (1989 census), making it the tenth most populous region in Kazakhstan. The city's history has been influenced by people of many nations and religions. Kokshetau retains multiethnic population, with 59% ethnic Kazakhs (up from 36%), the rest being mostly 28% ethnic Russians (down from 42%) and other ethnic groups such as Ukrainians, Tatars and Germans. Kokshetau City Administration (area of ), with a population of roughly 165,153 residents, includes one settlement administration (which consists of the work settlement of Stantsyonny) and the Krasnoyarsk rural district, which includes two rural settlements (the villages of Krasny Yar and Kyzyl Zhuldyz).

The city is considered to have been founded in 1824 as a military fortress, while it was granted city status in 1895. It was the centre of Kokshetau Region, which was abolished in 1997. It is well known for its nature and tourist sites, such as Burabay and Zerendi, among others. The city's main football team is FC Okzhetpes. The city is served by Kokshetau Airport (KOV).

Kokshetau is an important economic, educational, and cultural centre of the Akmola Region. Attractions in and around Kokshetau include Akmola Regional Museum of History and Local Lore, Bukpa Hill, Kokshetau City Park, Kokshetau City History Museum, Museum of Literature and Art. The northwest entrance to Burabay National Park and Burabay spa town is a little over 43 miles (70 km) from Kokshetau. Kokshetau was awarded the title Kazakhstan City of Culture for the year 2021.

Names and etymology 

 
 
 

That is how from ancient times Kazakhs were calling the highest mountain in Akmola Region "Mount Kokshe" (947 m), located 60 miles away from the city.
 
Following the collapse of the Soviet Union, Kazakhstan declared its independence on 16 December 1991 (Kazakhstan Independence Day), and on 7 October 1993, by the Resolution of the Presidium of the Supreme Council of the Republic of Kazakhstan, the city of  Kokchetav was renamed to the more Kazakh sounding Kokshetau as part of the government's campaign to apply Kazakh names to cities, but the city's airport still retains KOV as its IATA code. In Russian it became known as Kokshetau.

Chronology of name changes
Historically, several names in various languages have identified Kokshetau.

 Stanitsa Kokchetavskaya (1827–1868; which is a romanized back-transliteration from Russian name in Cyrillic:)
 Kokchetav (1868–1993; in publications dating from the Soviet period, the city name was occasionally spelled in English as "Kokchetav", which is a back-transliteration from post-revolution Russian name in Cyrillic: , Russian name in Cyrillic script (1868-1918): ; Kazakh name in Yañalif script (1929-1940): , Kazakh name in Cyrillic script (after 1940))
 Kokshetau (since 1993; which is a romanized back-transliteration from Russian name in Cyrillic: ; Kazakh name in Cyrillic script: , Kazakh name in Latin script (new version before 2021): , Kazakh name in Latin script (latest version of the Kazakh Latin alphabet after 2021))

Physical geography and geology

Location

Kokshetau is located in the country of Kazakhstan and lies in the northern portion of Akmola Region. The city is located on the border of the West Siberian Plain, on the southeastern shore of Lake Kopa, at an altitude of 234 meters above sea level, in the Kokshetau Mountains, north part of the Kokshetau Hills, the foothills of which surround the city from the south and west.

There are numerous hills in the vicinity of the city (Bukpa Hill). The city is located in the flat part of the interfluve of the Kylshakty river, flowing in the eastern part of the city, and the Shagalaly river, flowing from the western side of the city. The city has several parks and gardens. Also, within the city limits can be found small forests, mostly consisting of birches and pine plantations. The Kokshetau area is known for its two national parks, Burabay and Kokshetau.

Time 
The time offset from the UTC used by Kokshetau is 6 hours after UTC, or UTC+6:00 (ALMT). This is also used by most of Kazakhstan. This time apply throughout the year as Kazakhstan does not observe Daylight saving time (DST).

Administrative districts and microdistricts

Kokshetau is divided into seven administrative districts.

 Bukpa 
 Kokshe 
 Bostandyk 
 Sary-Arka 
 Beybitshilik 
 Aul 
 Zhaylau

Kokshetau is divided into seventeen administrative microdistricts.
 City Centre
 Barmashino
 Abylai Khan Avenue
 Regional hospital
 Birlik
 Sary-Arka
 Sunkar
 Koktem
 Vasilkov
 Town of builders
 Railway station
 Jubilee
 Khassenov market
 Central
 Zhaylau
 Shanghai

Administrative-Territorial Division  

Kokshetau is the capital of the Akmola Region. Kokshetau city administration (area of ), with a population of roughly 165 153 residents, includes one settlement administration and the Krasnoyarsk rural district, which includes two rural settlements.

Climate

According to the Köppen climate classification, Kokshetau lies in a cold semi-arid climate zone (Köppen climate classification: BSk) with extreme continental influences. The city has an extreme continental climate with long, very cold, frigid, snowy, dry winters and warm, dry, sunny summers (featuring occasional brief rain showers). Winter is frosty and long (more than 5 months). In spring, prevails clear and dry weather, with a large number of sunny days. Autumn begins in August or September, and the weather is observed from clear at the beginning of the season, to cloudy in October–November. Summer temperatures occasionally reach 35 °C (95 °F) while −30 to −35 °C (−22 to −31 °F) is not unusual between mid-December and early March.

Snow and ice are dominant during the winter season. July is the wettest month (averaging  of precipitation) while March is the driest (averaging  of precipitation). Typically, the city's Lake Kopa and rivers of Kylshakty and Shagalaly are frozen over between the second week of November and the beginning of April.

Nearby places

The village of Krasny Yar lies adjoined directly to the west of Kokshetau, on the bank of the River Shagalaly. Also contiguous with Kokshetau, directly to the east, with no natural border, is the smaller village of Stantsyonny.

Nearby cities

Petropavl
Astana
Ekibastuz
Omsk (Russia) 
Kostanay
Rudny
Shchuchinsk
Karaganda 
Kurgan (Russia)
Tyumen (Russia) 

Nearby towns

Atbasar
Arkalyk
Tara (Russia)
Taiynsha
Akkol
Derzhavinsk
Ereymentau
Esil
Ishim (Russia)
Makinsk
Stepnyak
Stepnogorsk

Nearby villages

Krasny Yar
Stantsyonny
Kyzylzhulduz
Kyzyltan
Kaindy
Akkol (Zerendi District)
Kishkenekol
Astrakhanka
Balkashino
Shortandy
Zerendi
Zhaksy

Cityscapes

History 
{{Quote box|width=20em|align=right|bgcolor=GhostWhite
|title=Historical affiliations
|quote=
 Omsk Oblast 1827–1838
∟ part of the Russian Empire
 Border control of the Siberian Kirghiz 1838–1854
∟ part of the Russian Empire
 Siberian Kirghiz Oblast 1854–1868
∟ part of the Russian Empire
 Akmolinsk Oblast 1868–1917
∟ part of the Russian Empire
 Alash Autonomy 1917–1918
 The Ufa Directory 1918–1918
 Russian Government 1918–1919
 Kirghiz Territory 1919–1920
∟ part of the Russian SFSR
 Kirghiz ASSR 1920–1922
∟ autonomous part of the Russian SFSR
 Kirghiz ASSR 1922–1925
∟ part of the Russian SFSR in the USSR
 Kazakh ASSR 1925–1936
∟ part of the Russian SFSR in the USSR
 Soviet Kazakhstan 1936–1991
∟ constituent republic of the Soviet Union 
 1991–present
}}

Kokshetau has a rich centuries-old past, which has incorporated all the main stages and turning points of the history of Kazakhstan. The territory of modern-day Kokshetau has seen the rise and fall of many cultures and empires. For many centuries, nomadic Kazakh tribes lived on the territory of the former Kokshetau Region. The territory of Kokshetau was part of the Middle Horde, the clans of the tribal union of the Argyns that occupied vast regions of Northern and Central Kazakhstan. In the 18th – 19th centuries, the headquarters of famous khans, such as Abylai Khan, Kasym Khan, Kenesary Khan, were located on the land of Kokshetau Region.

As Russia's hand stretched southwards, Kokshetau was initially founded on 29 April 1824 as an administrative outpost at the foot of the southern side of Mount Kokshe on the shores of Lake Ulken Shabakty. The Middle Horde signed treaties of protection with Russia. The local population strongly opposed the fact that the new settlement was placed in the chosen place. In the summer of 1827, the district order was transferred to the new place where the city of Kokshetau is now located. The settlement began to be called Kokchetav. The construction of the settlement began at the foot of Bukpa Hill, on the southern shores of Lake Kopa, and a picket was set up to protect the district order.

By the middle of 19th-century, the population of the settlement was significantly increasing due to the migration of the peasants from Russia (Povolzhye) and Ukraine who were driven to migrate by starvation and poverty to farm the steppe. In 1868, when the Akmolinsk Oblast was formed, Kokshetau became a district city in this region, which further developed as a center of agricultural and animal husbandry and as a resort town. In 1876, the city lost its military significance. The line and fortress were abolished. In 1895, Kokshetau was granted city status. By that time the population in the town was above 5 thousand people.

In 1928, Kokshetau District was divided into several boroughs and until 1944 Kokshetau's territory was part of Karaganda Region and later part of North Kazakhstan Region. On 16 March 1944, according to the Decree of the Presidium of Supreme Soviet of Kazakh SSR, Kokshetau became the administrative center of the newly created Kokchetav Oblast. Relatively rapid growth and development of Kokshetau took place during the years of development of virgin lands, especially in the second half of the 1950s. In the spring of 1997, Kokshetau Oblast was abolished, the city was deprived of the status of a regional center. On 8 April 1999, after Akmola and North Kazakhstan regions were reorganized, Kokshetau became the center of Akmola Region.

Demographics

Kokshetau is the eighteenth-largest city in Kazakhstan. Kokshetau is an ethnically and culturally diverse city. Kokshetau ranks fourth in terms of population in Northern Kazakhstan, ranking after Pavlodar, Kostanay and Petropavl. It has changed its demographics, nowadays having more ethnic Kazakhs in a city that formerly had a Slavic majority. It is the only regional center in Northern Kazakhstan where Kazakhs make up the majority. Despite Kokshetau's Kazakh majority, Russian is the dominant language in the city. It is also common to find the Kazakh being spoken in the city, mainly by Kazakhs and other Turkic people. Residents of Kokshetau are referred to as  "көкшетаулықтар" (kökşetaulyqtar) in Kazakh and  "кокшета́уцы" (kokshetautsy) in Russian.

Histogram of population evolution of Kokshetau from 1959. 

Note: 2020 and 2018 are population estimates; 1897 is the Russian Imperial Census; 1959, 1970, 1979 and 1989 are the Soviet Census.

 Ethnic and national composition 
As of January 2022, the population of Kokshetau is 150,649, and the extended urbanized area has 165,153 inhabitants.

Historically, Kokshetau was ethnically diverse. As of the 2020 Census, ethnic Kazakhs made up (~58%) of the city population, representing an increase from 36% in 1999. The ethnic makeup of the city's population as of year 2020 was:

In 1989, Kokshetau had a population of 136,757. The ethnic mix was about 18.5% Kazakh, 54.5% Russian and 27.0% other ethnic groups.

Kazakh and Russian are both the main spoken languages.

 Religion 

The city's religious profile is highly diverse. Islam (primarily Sunni Islam) is the predominant religion within Kokshetau, with 56.65% of residents identifying as Muslims in the 2009 Census. There were 83,436 Muslims reported in the 2009 census. Kokshetau's first Mosque was established by 
Ablay (Abilkhair) Gabbas in 1846.

Other religions practiced are Christianity (primarily Russian Orthodox, Roman Catholicism, and Protestantism). Christianity is Kokshetau's second largest religion. There were 60,168 Christians reported in the 2009 census. Much of Kokshetau's civic life and civil society is secular in the sense that it has no religious character.

Kokshetau has a mosque constructed in the beginning of the 20th century and a Russian Orthodox Church temple of Archangel Michael. The Kokshetau and Akmola diocese is located in the Church of the Resurrection in the city. In 1997, a Roman Catholic Church was built in neo-Gothic style using red bricks. A new mosque for 1,200 people named after Nauan Hazrat opened in 2015.

Mosques:
 Nauan Hazrat Mosque (capacity 1,200—1,400), located at the corner of Momishuly and Auelbekov streets. It is the largest mosque in Akmola Region.
 Zhakiya Kazhi Mosque

Russian Orthodox churches:
 Church of the Resurrection, Kokshetau (capacity 1,500), (ROC)
 Church of the Holy Archangel Michael, Kokshetau, (ROC)
 St George's Church, Kokshetau. Kokshetau's first Christian Church.

Roman Catholic churches:
 Church of St. Anthony of Padua, Kokshetau

Culture

Theatres
Kokshetau has a strong theater culture. 
 Akmola Regional Russian Drama Theater (opened in 1977), which also incorporates Palace of Culture
 Akmola Regional Kazakh Music and Drama Theatre named after Shahhmet Kussainov (opened in 1996)
 Children's puppet theater "Altyn Saka" (opened in 2022)

Philharmonic
 Akmola Regional Philharmonic named after Ükılı Ybyrai was founded in 1956.

Museums
There are about fife museums in Kokshetau.
 Akmola Regional Museum of History and Local Lore (opened in 1920)
 Kokshetau City History Museum (KCHM; opened as Valerian Kuibyshev’s Memorial Museum in 1949)  
 Museum of Mercy and Courage (opened in 1982)
 Museum of Literature and Art (opened in 1989)
 Museum of the Hero of the Soviet Union  Malik Gabdullin (opened in 1993), located at the corner of Auelbekov and Nazarbayev streets, on the eastern side of the town centre.

 Cinemas 
The first film screening in the city of Kokchetav (now Kokshetau) took place in 1910.
 Cinema Alem (formerly known as the Druzhba Cinema; it was built in 1963, and as of 2023 was still being used as a cinema). It is located in Independence Square and is currently the largest cinema in the city.

 Libraries 
The city has 12 libraries. In addition to the libraries affiliated with the various universities and schools, the Akmola Regional Universal Scientific Library is a major research library. There are several archives in Kokshetau.

 Akmola Regional Universal Scientific Library (ARUSL) named after Magzhan Zhumabayev. ARUSL was inaugurated in 1946.

 Economy 
Kokshetau has traditionally been an important commercial center in northern Kazakhstan, but after the collapse of the Soviet Union most of the old manufacturing lines either stopped working or had to greatly reduce their operations. Nevertheless, the city continues to be an important regional center for the Akmola Region, acting as a commercial hub for the surrounding areas in the region. In recent years, the city has started attracting more investment from various corporations.

Large industrial enterprises of Kokshetau include: gold mining enterprise JSC "Altyntau Kokshetau"; JSC "Tynys" – the production of medical products, weighing equipment, water meters, aircraft units and assemblies, polyethylene pipes; machine-building plant OJSC "KamAZ-Engineering"; JSC "Kokshetau Mineral Waters". Food factories supply Kokshetau and Akmola Region with sausages, semi-finished meat products, bread, dairy products, and confectionery. The city also has a gold recovery factory and a new ceramic brick factory.

From Ekibastuz to Kokshetau runs an overhead power line designed for a transmission voltage of 1,150 kV, the Ekibastuz-Kokshetau powerline. Kokshetau's retail business is growing with several newly built malls and shopping centres.

Healthcare
Local hospitals include the Avicenna Medical Centre, Viamedis Rehabilitation Centre among many others.

 Food 
There is a broad array of restaurants in Kokshetau that serve typical and international food. 
Popular food from Kokshetau includes:
Beshbarmak
Sorpa
Kuurdak
Qazı
Manti
Baursak
Shelpek
Qurt
Kumys
Shubat

Media

Kokshetau is the center of television and radio broadcasting in Akmola Region. All major Kazakhstani newspapers are active in Kokshetau. There are local TV stations, the Internet, and print media. The city has a developed telecommunications system.

Newspapers

Kokshetau's first newspaper was the weekly Tselinnyy kray, established in 1920, which would change its name to the Akmolinskaya Pravda in 1992. In the city, there are some popular urban newspapers. Akmolinskaya Pravda, Stepnoy mayak and Kokshetau are Russian-language media headquartered in the city. Akmolinskaya Pravda is the oldest newspaper of the city.

 Regional socio-political newspaper "Akmolinskaya Pravda" is a long-running daily local paper, with local and regional coverage.
 Republican newspaper "Bukpa"
 Regional newspaper "Arka Azhary"
 Regional newspaper "Stepnoy mayak"

TV and radio

Kokshetau television networks:
 Local television news is covered by TV channel Kazakhstan–Kokshetau
 Balapan
 Cartoon Network
 Channel One Eurasia
 Channel 31
 Disney Channel
 Euronews
 Gakku TV
 Khabar 24
 MTV
 Nickelodeon
 Qazsport
Kokshetau radio stations:
 "Kazakh Radio": 101.0 FM
 "Russian Radio Asia": 102.0 FM
 "Autoradio Kazakhstan": 102.5 FM
 "Shalkar Radio": 103.7 FM
 "Europe Plus Kazakhstan": 104.2 FM
 "Energy FM": 104.8 FM
 "Radio NS": 105.7 FM
 "Zhuldyz FM": 106.1 FM
 "Radio Dacha": 106.5 FM
 "People's Radio": 107.0 FM
 "Tengri FM": 107.6 FM

Internet media
Kokshetau City Administration   
Kokshetau - Kazakhstan  
Aqmola News  
Akmolinskaya Pravda 

Transport

Partly due to its location, Kokshetau is a major transport hub on the highway and rail networks.

 City transport 
The city transport in Kokshetau consists of a network of buses, minibuses (marshrutka) and taxis that are available 24 hours a day. Public transport in Kokshetau is heavily privatized and mostly handled by private operators.

 Railway 
The city is an important railroad hub in the northern part of Kazakhstan. Kokshetau Railway station is served by the Kazakhstan Railways, which links Petropavl to Almaty. The first train pulled into the Kokshetau Railway station on 2 June 1922. Railways are Kokshetau's one of the main modes of intracity and suburban transportation. Kazakhstan Railways (who manage the station) provide freight and passenger traffic to and from Kokshetau.

There are two railway stations in the city: Kokshetau-1 and Kokshetau-2. Kokshetau-1 station is the city's main station and a major stop for numerous passenger trains traveling between Petropavl and the other regions of Kazakhstan each day. The popular Tulpar-Talgo service to Almaty takes sixteen hours.

 Intercity buses 
Kokshetau Central Bus Terminal (Kökşetau avtobeketı), which opened in 1981, serves the city of Kokshetau. The bus station is on the Vernadsky Street 8 across the road from Kokshetau Railway Station. It links the city with the villages in Akmola Region and other cities in Kazakhstan and the neighboring countries. Frequent schedules of bus routes connect Kokshetau to Astana, Petropavl, Karaganda, Pavlodar, Kostanay, Omsk, Yekaterinburg, Tobolsk, Tyumen and Kurgan. Many of these are cross-country services operating from north to south, for which Kokshetau provides interchange facilities.

Air travel

Kokshetau and surrounding communities are served by one commercial international airport: Kokshetau International Airport , which is the seventeenth-busiest airport (2019) by passenger traffic in Kazakhstan. The airport has a capacity of handling 200 passengers per hour. The Kokshetau International Airport, which opened in 1945, was significantly upgraded in 2013 with a new 2850-metre runway capable of accommodating all aircraft types without any restrictions. In 2013, the airport received its first scheduled flight after the renovation to Moscow, Russia. The airport can be reached by car, public transport, or taxi. Seasonal flights to Frankfurt am Main, were available in 2004 but have been cancelled since. It serves mostly domestic flights. SCAT Airlines fly to and from Almaty, Aktau and Turkistan as well as FlyArystan operates three weekly flights to Almaty. The former largest carrier of the Kokshetau Airport — Air Kokshetau — is not serving any regular destinations as of 2021.

 Highways 
The main roads to/from Kokshetau are:

 The city is served by the A1, which begins in Petropavl and leads to Astana passing Kokshetau, Shchuchinsk and Makinsk. European route  intersect in Kokshetau;
 The A13, which connects Kokshetau to Omsk (Russia);

Other major roads passing through Kokshetau include:

 The R11 highway connects Kokshetau to Kostanay (via the M36);
 The R12 highway connects Kokshetau to Atbasar

Architecture

Landmarks
The city is full of numerous buildings and monuments that reflect its rich and diverse history. The architecture of Kokshetau has been shaped through its history by the progression of historical eras. Many buildings of Kokshetau are ranged from a different number of architectural styles. The architecture of the city dates back to 19th century, the city had numerous wooden buildings with elaborate decor. Kokshetau is the home of a unique architectural tradition and community with number of historical buildings in city. Industrialization in Kokshetau started in the late 1920s. There are a number of two-story wooden houses in the city built mostly in the middle of the 20th century as temporary habitations. Among other notable buildings are the mansions of the merchant Andrei Vasilievich Sokolov (late of the 19th century - beginning of the 20th century), the Akmola Regional Museum of History and Local Lore (beginning of the 20th century). The city’s apartment houses are called “Khrushchyovka” and “Stalinka” due to the peculiarities of architectural approaches in their construction.

Education

Kokshetau is a regional centre of education and has a large number of educational establishments, including universities, professional colleges and gymnasiums (high schools). Primary and secondary schools in Kokshetau include state-run and private institutions.

Pre-university education
Kokshetau has 34 (secondary education) schools, including 6 lyceums and 6 gymnasiums.

 Kokshetau Nazarbayev Intellectual School of Physics and Mathematics (NIS Kokshetau PhM) was established in 2009, as a branch of the Nazarbayev Intellectual Schools (NIS), a network of schools in Kazakhstan.
 Kokshetau Bilim-Innovation Public Lyceum (former “Kazakh-Turkish Lyceum”) for gifted children.

Institutions of higher education
The city is currently home to the following state higher educational institutions:

 Kokshetau State University (which is named after Shokan Ualikhanov), established 1962 — offers opportunities to study undergraduate, graduate and PhD programs in most fields. It is the biggest university in Kokshetau with 7,047 students and 499 academic staff.
 Kokshetau University (named after Abay Myrzakhmet), established 2000.
 Kokshetau Technical Institute of the Ministry of Emergency Situations of the Republic of Kazakhstan
 Kokshetau Academy of Economics and Management

A number of other non-state-funded institutions for further education operate in the city.

 Sport 

Sport has always been important in Kokshetau. Football and ice hockey are by far the most popular sports in the city. Kokshetau has many parks that provide excellent pitches for impromptu games. The city is home to the FC Okzhetpes football club, based in the Okzhetpes Stadium, and which has a capacity of 4,500, which participates in the Kazakhstan Premier League, the top division of football in Kazakhstan. In 2015 and 2018, they finished first place in the Kazakhstan First Division. A number of well-known athletes, both world and Olympics champions, are associated with the city.

Burabay Sports Complex serves as home arena to the ice hockey club Arlan Kokshetau, which competes in the Kazakhstan Hockey Championship. Arlan Kokshetau hockey players were the champions of Kazakhstan in the season 2017/2018. Arlan Kokshetau players also became the first team from Kazakhstan to win IIHF Continental Cup in the season 2018/2019. The city has an ice rink for winter sports. Several sports clubs are active in the city:

Parks and recreation

Kokshetau is home to a large number of parks and recreation areas. 
 City Park, the city's largest and oldest park, established in 1957.
 Revolution Fighters Park

 Elikti 
Elikti is a ski resort near Kokshetau, located on the slopes of Mount Elikti, at the elevation of 500 metres above sea level. The resort area is about 25 kilometres (16 mi) of Kokshetau city by the P11 road on the way from Kokshetau to Ruzayevka. It is popular for its mild climate, a large quantity of sunny days and a great amount of snow through the winter. Visitors can buy or rent any necessary skiing and snowboarding equipment.

Recreation around Kokshetau

Around Kokshetau, there are numerous nearby freshwater lakes such as Lake Burabay, Lake Ulken Shabakty, Lake Kishi Shabakty, Lake Aiyrtau and the Lake Zerendi, which are popular among Kokshetau residents for recreation, swimming and watersports and can be quickly reached by car.

In literature
 The city was marked by the ethnographer and publicist Grigory Potanin, who visited it in the 1890s.
 Anastasia Tsvetayeva dedicated to the city the story in her famous and one of the best-known work Starost i molodost'' (Old Age and Youth, 1967).

International relations

Twin towns – Sister cities
Kokshetau is twinned with the following regions, cities, and counties:

Cooperation agreements
Kokshetau has cooperation agreements with:

   Krasnoyarsk, Russia (2022)

See also

 :Category: People from Kokshetau
 European route E125
 Kokshetau Mountain
 Kokshetau National Park
 Kokshetau Region
 List of cities in Kazakhstan

References

External links

 Official web site 
 360° QTVR fullscreen panoramas of the Kokshetau
 Visitaqmola.kz – Tourism website for Akmola Region 

 
Cities in Central Asia
Cities and towns in Kazakhstan
Populated places established in 1824
Akmolinsk Oblast (Russian Empire)
Kokchetav Oblast
Populated places in Akmola Region
Populated places established in the 19th century
19th-century establishments in Kazakhstan
1824 establishments in the Russian Empire
1824 establishments in Asia